Mohammad Naim Sheikh (born 22 August 1999) is a Bangladeshi cricketer. He made his international debut for the Bangladesh cricket team in November 2019.

Domestic career
Naim made his List A debut for Legends of Rupganj in the 2017–18 Dhaka Premier Division Cricket League on 22 February 2018. Prior to his List A debut, he was part of Bangladesh's squad for the 2018 Under-19 Cricket World Cup.

Naim made his first-class debut for Dhaka Metropolis in the 2018–19 National Cricket League on 15 October 2018. In October 2018, he was named in the squad for the Dhaka Dynamites team, following the draft for the 2018–19 Bangladesh Premier League. He made his Twenty20 debut for the Dhaka Dynamites in the 2018–19 Bangladesh Premier League on 12 January 2019.

Naim was the leading run-scorer for Legends of Rupganj in the 2018–19 Dhaka Premier Division Cricket League tournament, with 807 runs in 16 matches. In August 2019, he was one of 35 cricketers named in a training camp ahead of Bangladesh's 2019–20 season. In November 2019, he was selected to play for the Rangpur Rangers in the 2019–20 Bangladesh Premier League.

International career
In September 2019, Naim received his maiden call up for national team, when he was added to the squad for last two Twenty20 Internationals (T20Is) in the 2019–20 Bangladesh Tri-Nation Series, but he did not play in the series. In October 2019, he was named in Bangladesh's T20I squad for their series against India. He made his T20I debut for Bangladesh, against India, on 3 November 2019.

In November 2019, Naim was named in Bangladesh's squad for the 2019 ACC Emerging Teams Asia Cup in Bangladesh. Later the same month, he was named in Bangladesh's squad for the men's cricket tournament at the 2019 South Asian Games. The Bangladesh team won the gold medal, after they beat Sri Lanka by seven wickets in the final.

In February 2020, Naim was named in Bangladesh's One Day International (ODI) squad for their series against Zimbabwe. He made his ODI debut for Bangladesh, against Zimbabwe, on 6 March 2020.

In September 2021, Naim was named in Bangladesh's squad for the 2021 ICC Men's T20 World Cup. In December 2021, he named in Bangladesh's Test squad for their series against New Zealand. He made his Test debut for Bangladesh on 9 January 2022, against New Zealand.

Teams Played
Bangladesh, Bangladesh U23, Bangladesh U19, Bangladesh A, Bangladesh Cricket Board XI, Dhaka Dynamites, Rangpur Rangers, Beximco Dhaka, Minister Group Dhaka.

References

External links
 

1999 births
Living people
Bangladeshi cricketers
Bangladesh Test cricketers
Bangladesh One Day International cricketers
Bangladesh Twenty20 International cricketers
Dhaka Dominators cricketers
Dhaka Metropolis cricketers
Legends of Rupganj cricketers
Cricketers from Dhaka
South Asian Games gold medalists for Bangladesh
South Asian Games medalists in cricket